This is a complete list of the reported and confirmed tornadoes in the 2008 Super Tuesday tornado outbreak, which took place on February 5 and 6, 2008 across a large portion of the southern United States and the lower Ohio Valley. The event began on Super Tuesday, while 24 U.S. states were holding primary elections and caucuses to select the presidential candidates for the upcoming presidential election. During a 12-hour period, 87 tornadoes were produced in nine states. Five tornadoes were rated EF4 on the Enhanced Fujita Scale and five others were rated EF3. There were 57 fatalities across four states, becoming the deadliest tornado outbreak in the United States since May 31, 1985.

Confirmed tornadoes

February 5 event

February 6 event

Notes

References 

F4 tornadoes by date
Super Tuesday tornado outbreak
Tornado outbreak